Barwinek may refer to the following locations in Poland:

 Barwinek, Łódź Voivodeship, village in Łódź Voivodeship
 Barwinek, Podkarpackie Voivodeship, village in Podkarpackie Voivodeship